Under the "Law on Territorial Organization and Local Self-Government" adopted in 1994, Republika Srpska was divided into 80 municipalities.  After the conclusion of the Dayton Peace Agreement, the law was amended in 1996 to reflect the changes to the entity's borders and now provides for the division of Republika Srpska into 64 municipalities.

List of municipalities

The following list includes 64 municipalities of Republika Srpska (with population data from 2013 census):

Former municipalities 

The Law on Territorial Organization and Local Self-Government was amended in 1996 to provide that certain municipalities whose territory was now completely or partially located in the Federation of Bosnia and Herzegovina would "temporarily stop functioning." In addition, the parts of these former municipalities that were located in Republika Srpska (if any) were incorporated into other municipalities.

The following are the former municipalities of Republika Srpska:

Glamoč (part included in Šipovo)
Gradačac (parts included in Modriča and Pelagićevo)
Grahovo (formerly Bosansko Grahovo)
Hadžići
Ilijaš (part included in Sokolac)
Konjic (parts included in Nevesinje)
Kladanj (parts included in Šekovići)
Lukavac (parts included in Petrovo)
Maglaj (parts included in Doboj)
Olovo (parts included in Sokolac)
Skelani (included in Srebrenica)
Srbobran (parts included in Šipovo) (formerly Donji Vakuf)
Tuzla (parts included in Lopare)
Vogošća

Special municipalities

Sarajevo
In 1993, the Law on the Serb City of Sarajevo during the State of War or Immediate Danger of War was adopted providing that Serb Sarajevo (later Istočno Sarajevo) consisted of the following municipalities: Centar, Hadžići, Ilidža, Ilijaš, Novo Sarajevo, Stari Grad, Rajlovac, Vogošća, and Trnovo. Ilidža, Hadžići, Ilijaš, Rajlovac, and Vogošća were incorporated into the Federation of Bosnia and Herzegovina. The city now consists of the following six municipalities: Srpska Ilidža (name replaced by "Kasindo" in 2004), Srpsko Novo Sarajevo (name replaced by "Lukavica" in 2004), Pale, Sokolac, Srpski Stari Grad (name replaced by "Istočni Stari Grad" in 2004), and Trnovo.

In 1996, the name "Serb City of Sarajevo" was changed to "City of Srpsko Sarajevo".  In 2004, the Constitutional Court of Bosnia and Herzegovina decided that the temporary name of the city would be decided that the former name of the city "be temporary replaced" with the name "City of Istočno (East) Sarajevo".

Brčko
A significant portion of the Brčko District (48% of its area) was created from territory of Republika Srpska. RS controlled this territory until March 8, 2000 (see the History and Mandate of the OHR North/Brcko). The Brčko District was created as a shared territory, a condominium, of both entities (RS and the Federation of Bosnia and Herzegovina), but it was not placed under control of either, and is hence under direct jurisdiction of Bosnia and Herzegovina. RS's authorities never officially accepted the Brčko Arbitration result, but the official decision about jurisdiction remains.

See also 

 List of populated places in Bosnia and Herzegovina
 List of settlements in the Federation of Bosnia and Herzegovina
 List of cities in Bosnia and Herzegovina
 Municipalities of Bosnia and Herzegovina

References

External links
 Republika Srpska Government Website regarding municipalities 

 r